Petrovka is a rural locality (a village) in Kosh-Yelginsky Selsoviet, Bizhbulyaksky District, Bashkortostan, Russia. The population was 139 as of 2010.

Geography 
It is located 22 km from Bizhbulyak.

References 

Rural localities in Bizhbulyaksky District